Metro is an Indonesia based chain department store selling cosmetics, apparel and fashion accessories. Founded by Ong Tjoe Kim in 1953, Metro currently has 12 outlets located across Indonesia and 2 in Singapore .

History
Metro's founder Ong Tjoe Kim originally from Fujian, China, migrated to Indonesia when he was a teenager. He joined the Toko Dezon department store and worked his way up to a managerial position. In 1952, Ong decided to venture out on his own and eventually opened the first Metro store in 1953 in Surabaya, Indonesia. Ong chose the name, Metro, after his love for movies made by film studio, Metro-Goldwyn-Mayer.  Metro opened its first Singapore-based outlet in 1957, at the site that is now the Singapore Treasury Building, after Ong migrated from Indonesia to Singapore, pitching its business at the wealthy housewives of Indonesia and Singapore.

A department store was opened in Hong Kong in 1960. The  first Metro branch under the name of Metrotex opened in Liat Towers on Orchard Road in 1965, being one of the first Singapore department stores to carry imported designer goods. The branch was renamed Metro Orchard when it moved into the Holiday Inn Shopping Complex on Scotts Road in 1973. Metro continued to expand and set up more branches including Metro Supreme in 1971, Metro Golden Mile in 1974, Metro Grand in Lucky Plaza in 1978 and Metro Scotts and Metro Far East in 1983. Other than carrying in overseas label, Metro delved into developing Singapore's private label in fashion merchandise.

In January 2012, Metro Department Store was brought back to Surabaya, Indonesia, where it was opened in Ciputra World Surabaya, after 60 years of founding.

Metro Holdings

Metro Pte Ltd was publicly listed on the Singapore Stock Exchange in 1973 as Metro Holdings Limited.

As the company started to expand, Metro Holdings began to look towards diversifying its interests and expanding beyond retailing.  In 1977, the company acquired Orchard Square Development Corporation Private Limited, the joint developer for Ngee Ann City and set up Metrobilt Pte Ltd, expanding its business into construction and building. In the same year, the company opened Futaba Bakery in the supermarket of Metro Golden Mile in a joint venture with Futaba Bakery Co Ltd, Japan. The company continued to diversify its business by buying into Datalogue (S) Pte Ltd, a company dealing in computer software. Metro Holdings also ventured into credit leasing business when it bought into Trans-Pacific Credit Pte Ltd in 1982. Metro Holdings also co-founded luxury brand retailer chain, The Hour Glass in 1979. The company also started a subsidiary company, Transmarco in 1978 as a distribution marketing company for luxury brands.

The Metro group's key businesses today focuses primarily on property investments in China, Japan and UK and retail properties in China and Indonesia.

Metro Private Limited
Metro Private Limited as the retail branch of Metro Holdings Limited also went into specialty retailing and ventured into many retail formats. Metro Pte Ltd initiated a joint venture with Toys ‘R’ Us Inc in 1984 and opened its first store Toys ‘R’ Us Metro outlet in Marine Parade. The venture was terminated in 1993 when the Metro Holdings sold its shares back to the parent company of Toys ‘R’ Us Inc. In 1993, Metro (Pte) Ltd partnered with Kmart USA to open 3 Kmart Metro stores in Marina Square, United Square and Century Square. The venture was dissolved in 1996. Metro is also the local franchisee for British high-street fashion and accessories chains Monsoon and Accessorize.

In the 1990s, Metro re-entered the suburbs following Singapore's public housing trend and development to open Metro Tampines in 1996, Metro Woodlands in 1998, Metro Sengkang in 2002 and Metro City Square in 2009. With the closure of the Metro outlet at Tampines in 2007. Metro Paragon is its flagship store at Paragon mall and Metro Centrepoint, opened in November 2014 at The Centrepoint mall. Metro closed down one at Sengkang in 2015 and City Square in 2015. Metro shuttered its store at Centrepoint on 15 September 2019. Therefore, leaving Metro with two stores left, one at Paragon Orchard and the second one at Causeway Point a suburban area.

Logo design
The logo of Metro was created in 1957, with a simple typography that included the Chinese calligraphy of 美羅, which has a similar pronunciation as Metro.  The inspiration for the first logo came from the ancient Chinese seal. The logo underwent a change in 1982, when it was redesigned by Landor Associates Ltd. The new logo, reflects the ‘East meets West’ influence incorporates the calligraphic M, customised hand-lettered Metro wordmark in English and brushed-lettered calligraphy Metro wordmark in Chinese.

Milestones of Metro

Metro Indonesia

It opened its first branch at Pondok Indah Mall in 1990, followed by Plaza Senayan in 1996. Metro expands in 2001-2002 as they opened two new branches at Bandung Supermal (now Trans Studio Mall) & Mal Taman Anggrek respectively. From 2010 to 2012, Metro opened 4 new branches respectively: Makassar's Trans Studio Mall in 2010, Surabaya's Ciputra World in 2011, Jakarta's Gandaria City in 2012, and Solo's The Park Mall in 2013. In 2017, Metro finally expands after 4 years hiatus, opening a new branch in Puri Indah Mall and Grand Kawanua Manado. In 2019, Metro opened its sixth Jakarta store in Trans Studio Mall Cibubur.

Metro Pacific Place, opened in 2008, is closed in 2017. Used to be called as M Pacific Place in 2008 before converted to Metro in 2009, this location is relocated to the Puri Indah Mall branch in 2017, based on inside sources. Meanwhile, in 2018, Metro downsized its Plaza Senayan store from four floors to two floors, followed by its branch at Mal Taman Anggrek in July 2019, downsized from three floors to two floors. At the same year, Grand Kawanua Citywalk closed for reconception, forcing Metro to close. Metro then relocated to Manado Town Square 3 on 3 December 2021, and opened at Margo City on 10 December 2021. Both stores are replacing the recently liquidated Parkson's middle brand Centro, who were declared bankrupt by court in May 2021. On 7 January 2022, Metro closed its Mal Taman Anggrek store without prior announcement.

As of 2021, all Metro stores in Indonesia are two-stories high.

The chain's CEO and President Christine Barki has been featured in the 100 Next-Era CEOs in Asia 2011 by Japan Times.

CT Corp owned the franchise alongside Metro Singapore, with CT being the largest shareholder. The franchise was used to be owned by Rajawali Corporation.

References 

Companies listed on the Singapore Exchange
Department stores of Indonesia
Department stores of Singapore
Indonesian brands